The 2016 Sanfrecce Hiroshima season is the club's eighth consecutive season in J1 League, and 46th overall in the Japanese top flight. Sanfrecce Hiroshima are also competing in the 2016 Japanese Super Cup and the 2016 AFC Champions League.

Squad

Transfers

Winter

In

Out

Summer

In

Out

Competitions

Overall

Overview

{| class="wikitable" style="text-align: center"
|-
!rowspan=2|Competition
!colspan=8|Record
|-
!
!
!
!
!
!
!
!
|-
| J1 League

|-
| Japanese Super Cup

|-
| Champions League

|-
! Total

Japanese Super Cup

J1 League

First stage

Results summary

Results by matchday

Matches

Second stage

Results summary

Results by matchday

Matches

Overall results

Results summary

AFC Champions League

Sanfrecce Hiroshima qualified for the Group Stage of the 2016 AFC Champions League by winning the 2015 J1 League. They were drawn in Group F along with China's Shandong Luneng Taishan, Korean outfit FC Seoul, and Buriram United from Thailand. Sanfrecce Hiroshima were automatically eliminated on 20 April after a 1-0 loss against Shandong Luneng Taishan, making a four-point gap with one game left.

Group stage

Statistics

Appearances and goals

Last updated on 28 August 2016.

|-ENG
|colspan="14"|Players who left the club in Winter/Summer transfer window or on loan:

Cards

Accounts for all competitions. Last updated on 28 August 2016.

References

External links
 Sanfrecce Hiroshima official site
 J.League official site

Sanfrecce Hiroshima
Sanfrecce Hiroshima seasons